The Port of Quebec is an inland port located in Quebec City, Quebec, Canada. It is the oldest port in Canada, and the second largest in Quebec after the Port of Montreal.

History
In the 19th century, the Port of Quebec was one of the most important in the world. It played a major role in the development of both the city and of Canada. In 1863, more than 1,600 ships went through the port, transporting almost 25,000 sailors. It was during this era that the shipbuilding industry grew considerably in Quebec City.

In the 20th century, the dredging of the Saint Lawrence River between Quebec City and Montreal moved major port activities upstream.  Today cruise traffic has replaced much of the former freight traffic.

References

External links 
 

Port
Ports and harbours of Quebec
River ports of Canada